"I Take My Chances" is a song co-written and recorded by American country music artist Mary Chapin Carpenter.  It was released in April 1994 as the seventh and final single from her album Come On Come On.  The song reached number 2 on the Billboard Hot Country Singles & Tracks chart in July 1994.  It was written by Carpenter and Don Schlitz.

Personnel
Credits are adapted from the liner notes of Come On Come On.
Mary Chapin Carpenter – vocals, acoustic guitar
Jon Carroll – piano
Denny Dadmun-Bixby – bass guitar
John Jennings – electric guitar, background vocals
Robbie Magruder – drums
Benmont Tench – Hammond organ

Critical reception
Deborah Evans Price, of Billboard magazine reviewed the song favorably, saying that it "achieves the perfect balance of intellect and accessibility."

Chart performance
"I Take My Chances" debuted at number 62 on the U.S. Billboard Hot Country Singles & Tracks for the week of May 1, 1994.

Year-end charts

References

1994 singles
Mary Chapin Carpenter songs
Songs written by Don Schlitz
Songs written by Mary Chapin Carpenter
Columbia Records singles
1992 songs